A crop top (also half shirt,  midriff top or cutoff shirt) is a top that exposes the waist, navel, or abdomen.

History

Women
The early history of the crop top intersects with cultural views towards the midriff, starting with the performance of Little Egypt at the 1893 Chicago World's Fair. Although the crop top first gained prominence in the fashion industry during the 1930s and 1940s—the latter in particular due to fabric rationing in World War II—it was largely confined to swimwear at the time. It was not until the sexual revolution of the late 1960s and early 1970s that it achieved widespread acceptance, worn by celebrities such as Barbara Eden (star of NBC's I Dream of Jeannie) and Jane Birkin. A variant style, the tied-up top or knotted shirt, also appeared in 1940s fashion and spread in popularity during the 1960s.

In the 1980s, cut-off crop tops became more common as part of the aerobics craze and as a result of the popularity of the movie Flashdance. Singer Madonna wore a mesh crop top in her music video for the song "Lucky Star".  In the 2010s, the crop top experienced a revival due to the popularity of 1990s fashion and they still remain popular in the 2020s.

Men
Crop tops have been worn by men since the 1970s. The early Rocky films have Sylvester Stallone and Carl Weathers wearing crop tops while working out.

The protective gear of American football with no shirt resembles a crop top. Eventually cropped jerseys became available which carried over to several 1980s broadcasts. Men also started to wear crop tops regardless of sport. Acceptance for men wearing no shirt could be seen to eliminate the need for a crop top. Various crop tops have been worn by rappers as well as American football athletes. However, in 2015 the National Collegiate Athletic Association increased restrictions on men wearing crop tops, which also includes rolling up longer jerseys, giving no reason for the change.

Since the mid-2010s, the male crop top has seen a major resurgence in popularity, including prominent celebrity figures such as football player Ezekiel Elliott, rapper Kid Cudi, rock star Josh Kiszka, and actors Matthew McConaughey and Zac Efron.

See also
Hip-huggers
Low-rise pants
Midriff

References

External links
 

1970s fashion
1980s fashion
1990s fashion
2000s fashion
2010s fashion
Shirts
Tops (clothing)